Douglas Meakin (28 March 1929 – 13 February 1998) was an English first-class cricketer and Royal Air Force airman.

Meakin made his debut in minor counties cricket for Bedfordshire against Cambridgeshire at Luton in the 1952 Minor Counties Championship. He played minor counties cricket for Bedfordshire intermittently until 1962, making 21 appearances in the Minor Counties Championship. While serving as a non-commissioned officer in the Royal Air Force, Meakin played first-class cricket for the Combined Services cricket team, making his first-class debut against Warwickshire at Birmingham in 1959. He made a further appearance in 1959 against Somerset, before making two more first-class appearances in 1962 against Cambridge University and Ireland. He scored a total of 55 runs across his four matches, with a high score of 16. With his right-arm fast bowling, he took 10 wickets at an average of 20.60, with best figures of 4 for 56.

He died at Norwich in February 1998.

References

External links

1929 births
1998 deaths
People from Swadlincote
Cricketers from Derbyshire
Royal Air Force airmen
English cricketers
Bedfordshire cricketers
Combined Services cricketers